Yerek-Mankunk (also, Yerek-Mankuni) is a village in the Tartar Rayon of Azerbaijan.

References 

Populated places in Tartar District